Anouk van de Wiel (born 10 July 1992) is a Dutch handball player who plays for Molde Elite.

References

1992 births
Living people
Dutch female handball players
Frisch Auf Göppingen players
Sportspeople from Venlo
Expatriate handball players
Dutch expatriate sportspeople in Germany
Dutch expatriate sportspeople in Norway
21st-century Dutch women